The Bank of Mirzapore (1835) was a bank founded in the year 1835 in British India. The bank was the seventeenth oldest bank in India.  It was liquidated in 1937.

History

Founding  
The bank was founded in 1835 in Mirzapur by a Mr. Bathurst, a businessman from England who had arrived in India with a hope of striking it big in the banking industry.

The bank printed its own notes and achieved a modest level of success in the bill discounting of its notes.

Management 

The bank was known for its punctuality and it soon gained the confidence of merchants and traders of Calcutta who came to rely on it for their banking needs. The owner of the bank Mr. Bathurst was able to build a large house in Mirzapur due to the success of his bank.

Final Years 

The bank faced a lot of competition from the Bank of Calcutta which had opened at around the same time and enjoyed the patronage of the East India Company. By 1837, the Bank of Mirzapore was unable to scale up its operations and was not able to compete with the Bank of Calcutta. The Bank of Mirzapore was finally liquidate in 1937.

Legacy 

The bank is notable for being the seventeenth oldest bank in India.

See also

Indian banking
List of banks in India
List of oldest banks in India

References

External links
 Oldest Banks in India
 Banking in India

Defunct banks of India
Banks established in 1835